Past Lives is a live album released in 2002 by Black Sabbath. It peaked at number 114 on the Billboard 200.  The first disc was previously known as Live at Last, an album not put out by Black Sabbath's record company, and therefore not an official Black Sabbath album. The second consists of recordings made for television and radio, previously only available on bootlegs. It was released as a digipak and later a standard jewel-case.

Track listing
All songs written by Ozzy Osbourne, Tony Iommi, Geezer Butler and Bill Ward.

Disc one
Tracks 1-5 were recorded at the Hardrock in Manchester, England on March 11, 1973. Tracks 6-9 were recorded at the Rainbow Theatre in London, England, on March 16, 1973.
 "Tomorrow's Dream"  – 3:03
 "Sweet Leaf"  – 5:26
 "Killing Yourself to Live"  – 5:29
 "Cornucopia"  – 3:57
 "Snowblind"  – 4:46
 "Embryo / Children of the Grave"  – 4:33
 "War Pigs"  – 7:36
 "Wicked World (Medley/jam that contains parts of "Into the Void", "Sometimes I'm Happy", "Supernaut" and a drum solo; transitions back into "Wicked World")  – 18:55
 "Paranoid"  – 3:14

Disc two
As with many bootleg releases, tracks 1, 5-9 are miscredited as being from the Olympia Theatre in Paris, France, on December 20, 1970.

In 2016, Warner Brothers/Rhino Records located the original master tapes for this concert for inclusion on the Super Deluxe Edition of Paranoid. It was then officially noted that these tracks (1, 5-9) were actually recorded by RTBF for television at Theatre 140, 140 Avenue Plasky, 1040  Bruzelles in Brussels, Belgium on October 3, 1970.

The entire performance in Brussels was first broadcast on "Pop Shop" by RTBF, Belgium on January 21, 1971 (part one) & April 4, 1971 (part two).

Tracks 2-4 were recorded at the Asbury Park Convention Hall in Asbury Park, New Jersey on August 5, 1975.
 "Hand of Doom / Rat Salad"  – 8:25
 "Hole in the Sky"  – 4:46
 "Symptom of the Universe"  – 4:52
 "Megalomania"  – 9:53
 "Iron Man"  – 6:25
 "Black Sabbath"  – 8:23
 "N.I.B."  – 5:31
 "Behind the Wall of Sleep"  – 5:03
 "Fairies Wear Boots"  – 6:39

The "deluxe edition" contains the same tracks as the original album.

Personnel
Tony Iommi - guitar
Bill Ward - drums
Ozzy Osbourne - vocals
Geezer Butler - bass guitar

Liner notes for the 2002 CD booklet were written by Bruce Pilato. Liner notes for the 2010 Deluxe Collector's Edition CD booklet were written by Alex Milas.

Charts

References 

Black Sabbath compilation albums
Black Sabbath live albums
2002 live albums
2002 compilation albums
Sanctuary Records live albums
Sanctuary Records compilation albums